Thomas Morosini (Venice, c. 1170/1175 – Thessalonica, June/July 1211) was the first Latin Patriarch of Constantinople, from 1204 to his death in July 1211. Morosini, then a sub-deacon, was elected patriarch by the Venetians immediately after the sack of Constantinople by the Fourth Crusade and the establishment of the Latin Empire. At first, his election was contested as uncanonical by Pope Innocent III.

His tenure was troubled and decreased the Latin Church's prestige. His relationship to the court of the Latin emperor Henry of Flanders was strained due to questions of jurisdiction, accusations of embezzlement from the treasury of the Hagia Sophia, and chiefly due to Morosini's exclusive promotion of Venetian clergy to higher ecclesiastical offices. He also failed to reconcile the Orthodox Byzantine Greeks, both clergy and people, to Catholic rule; instead, they transferred their allegiance to the Empire of Nicaea. After his death, the see remained vacant until the election in November 1215 of Bishop Gervasius (Gervais) of Heraclea Pontica.

Sources 

 
 
 

1170s births
1211 deaths
Latin Patriarchs of Constantinople
Latin Empire people
13th-century Italian Roman Catholic archbishops
Republic of Venice clergy